The Sejong City Council, officially the Sejong Special Self-Governing City Council  is the local council of Sejong City, South Korea.

There are a total of 18 members, with 16 members elected in the First-past-the-post voting system and 2 members elected in Party-list proportional representation.

Current composition

Organization 
The structure of Council consists of:
Chairman
Two Vice-chairmen
Standing Committees
Steering Committee of Council
Administration and Welfare Committee
Industry and Construction Committee
Education Committee
Special Committees
Special Committees on Budget and Accounts
Special Committees on Ethics

Recent election results

2018 

|- style="text-align:center;"
! rowspan="2" colspan="3" width="200" | Party
! colspan="4" | Constituency
! colspan="4" | Party list
! colspan="2" | Total seats
|- style="text-align:center;"
! width="60" | Votes
! width="40" | %
! width="40" | Seats
! width="32" | ±
! width="60" | Votes
! width="40" | %
! width="40" | Seats
! width="32" | ±
! width="40" | Seats
! width="32" | ±
|-
| width="1" style="background-color:" |
| style="text-align:left;" colspan=2| Democratic Party of Korea
| 85,299 || 62.97 || 16 || 8
| 79,752 || 59.01 || 1 || 0
| 17 || 8
|-
| width="1" style="background-color:" |
| style="text-align:left;" colspan=2| Liberty Korea Party
| 22,513 || 16.62 || 0 || 4
| 23,567 || 17.43 || 1 || 0
| 1 || 4
|-
| width="1" style="background-color:" |
| style="text-align:left;" colspan=2| Justice Party
| colspan=4 
| 17,369 || 12.85 || 0 || new
| 0 || new
|-
| width="1" style="background-color:" |
| style="text-align:left;" colspan=2| Bareunmirae Party
| 18,224 || 13.45 || 0 || new
| 14,455 || 10.69 || 0 || new
| 0 || new
|-
| width="1" style="background-color:" |
| style="text-align:left;" colspan=2| Independents
| 9,433 || 6.96 || 0 || 1
| colspan=4 
| 0 || 1
|-
|- style="background-color:#E9E9E9"
| colspan=3 style="text-align:center;" | Total
| 135,469 || 100.00 || 16 || –
| 135,143 || 100.00 || 2 || –
| 18 || –
|}

References 

Sejong City
Provincial councils of South Korea